The women's 3x3 basketball tournament at the 2019 Pan American Games in Lima, Peru was held between 27 and 29 July 2019.

Qualification 
Teams were entered based on their FIBA Ranking. Host nation Peru was barred from participating following sanctions imposed on the Peruvian Basketball Federation.

Rosters

Results

Preliminary round

Fifth place match

Medal round

Semifinals

Bronze medal match

Gold medal match

References

3x3 basketball at the 2019 Pan American Games